The 2007 İstanbul Cup was a tennis tournament played on indoor carpet courts. It was the third edition of the İstanbul Cup, and was part of the WTA Tier III tournaments of the 2007 WTA Tour. It was held in İstanbul from 21 through 26 May 2007.

Points and prize money

Point distribution

Prize money

* per team

Singles main-draw entrants

Seeds

Other entrants
The following players received wildcards into the singles main draw:
  Pemra Özgen  
  İpek Şenoğlu

The following players received entry from the qualifying draw:
  Ekaterina Afinogenova  
  Anastasija Sevastova
  Ekaterina Dzehalevich
  Anna Tatishvili

Retirements
  Patty Schnyder (left thigh strain)
  Aravane Rezaï (left knee injury)

Doubles main-draw entrants

Seeds

Other entrants
The following pairs received wildcards into the doubles main draw:
  Çağla Büyükakçay /  Pemra Özgen

Retirements
  Vania King (low back strain)
  Catalina Castaño (left thigh strain)

Champions

Singles

 Elena Dementieva def.  Aravane Rezaï, 7–6(7–5), 3–0 ret.

Doubles

 Agnieszka Radwańska /  Urszula Radwańska def.  Yung-Jan Chan /  Sania Mirza, 6–1, 6–3

References

External links
Singles Main and Qualifying Draws, Doubles Main Draw

 İstanbul Cup
İstanbul Cup
2007 in Turkish tennis
May 2007 sports events in Turkey